The legislative districts of Zamboanga Sibugay are the representations of the province of Zamboanga Sibugay in the Congress of the Philippines. The province is currently represented in the lower house of the Congress through its first and second congressional districts.

History 

Prior to gaining separate representation, areas now under the jurisdiction of Zamboanga Sibugay were represented under the Department of Mindanao and Sulu (1917–1935), the historical Zamboanga Province (1935–1953), Region IX (1978–1984) and Zamboanga del Sur (1953–1972; 1984–2001).

The passage of Republic Act No. 8973 on November 7, 2000, and its subsequent ratification by plebiscite on February 22, 2001, separated the entire third district of Zamboanga del Sur to form the new province of Zamboanga Sibugay. Zamboanga del Sur's former third district automatically became the representation of Zamboanga Sibugay upon its establishment in February 2001, but the new province only elected a representative under its own name beginning in the May 2001 elections.

The enactment of Republic Act No. 9360 on October 26, 2006, increased Zamboanga Sibugay's representation by reapportioning the province into two congressional districts, which began to elect their separate representatives in the 2007 elections.

1st District 

Municipalities: Alicia, Buug, Diplahan, Imelda, Mabuhay, Malangas, Olutanga, Payao, Talusan
Population (2020): 307,161

2nd District 

Municipalities: Ipil, Kabasalan, Naga, Roseller Lim, Siay, Titay, Tungawan
Total Barangay: 190
Total Land Area: 2,214.48 sq. km
Population (2020): 362,679

Lone District (defunct)

See also 
Legislative district of Mindanao and Sulu
Legislative district of Zamboanga
Legislative districts of Zamboanga del Sur

References 

Zamboanga Sibugay
Politics of Zamboanga Sibugay